The 2008 Puerto Rico gubernatorial election, took place on November 4, 2008 as part of the Puerto Rican general elections. It coincided with the 2008 United States general elections. Then-incumbent governor Aníbal Acevedo Vilá, Democratic, PPD was eligible for reelection, and ran for a second four-year term. His opponent, Luis Fortuño, Republican and PNP Resident Commissioner of Puerto Rico, defeated him.

Candidates

Popular Democratic Party
Incumbent Aníbal Acevedo Vilá (PPD/D) decided to run for a second four-year term. He faced a tough reelection campaign due to an indictment in March 2008 for alleged conspiracy to illegally raise money to pay off his campaign debts in 2000 and the fallout from the 2006 Puerto Rico budget crisis.

New Progressive Party
On February 19, 2007, Incumbent Resident Commissioner of Puerto Rico Luis Fortuño announced his candidacy for Governor of Puerto Rico for the 2008 general election and said he will not run for Congress. On May 18, 2007, Fortuño announced that former Attorney General Pedro Pierluisi would be his running mate and run for Fortuño's current office of Resident Commissioner of Puerto Rico. Pierluisi Urrutia was a classmate at Colegio Marista, a fellow member of the Puerto Rico Statehood Students Association and also a fellow cabinet member of Fortuño's during former Governor Pedro Rosselló's first term from 1993 to 1996. On March 7, 2007, Former Governor Pedro Rosselló stated that he was no longer interested in the Senate Presidency and is now focusing his attention in preventing Resident Commissioner Luis Fortuño from winning the March 2008 gubernatorial primary, and has allowed his name to be placed in nomination for the party's gubernatorial primary. Senate President Kenneth McClintock and four other senators won in San Juan Superior Court a suit to nullify the sanctions and expulsions that the party leadership has levied against them.  The Puerto Rico Supreme Court confirmed the lower court decision by a 5-to-1 vote.  As a result, McClintock and his supporters are recognized as NPP members and free to run under the party banner. On March 9, 2008, Pedro Rosselló conceded the victory to Luis Fortuño after a large margin of votes in favor of his opponent in the NPP party primaries for the presidency of the party and gubernatorial nomination. Rosselló admitted defeat even before the votes were completely tallied claiming Fortuño as the next candidate of the PNP party. In Rosselló's conceding speech he said "Luis Fortuño has been selected by the people to be the new president of this party and the candidate for governor. I always say the people speak and I obey, Fortuño here is your party and here is your office (signaling the party's official headquarters). Now its up to you, the loyal members of this party, to make sure that this new leadership works for the statehood for Puerto Rico". After this conceding speech it was rumored and even announced at Fortuño's headquarters that the former Governor would arrive there along with his loyal supporter and mayor of the capital city of San Juan, Jorge Santini, but after Fortuño's followers waited for hours to see their leaders united neither Rosselló or Santini arrived. After the primary was over it was heavily rumored by many that Rosselló would not be campaigning for Fortuño and that he'd resign as senator to go back to his home in Virginia. On March 10, 2008, Rosselló sent the media a written statement regarding his future in which he confirmed he will be retiring from active politics and will not be campaigning for any candidate, however he will finish his term as Senator for the Arecibo District.

Puerto Ricans For Puerto Rico Party

This Party was a newcomer to the political scene and put forward Rogelio Figueroa as it candidate for governor. It campaigned as a no status party, similar to the PPD at its start.

Puerto Rico Independence Party

The party had failed to register in the former 2004 elections. A new face was selected to run, as Edwin Irrizary Mora was the gubernatorial candidate. It campaigned as the "radical" option for voters.

Election results

See also 
 Puerto Rican general election, 2008

References

External links
 Washington Post: Puerto Rican Governor Plans to Seek Reelection
 UPI: Puerto Rico approves Acevedo candidacy
 New York Daily News: Luis Fortuño wins pro-statehood primary in Puerto Rico  

Gubernatorial election
2008
Puerto Rico